The BBC Northern Ireland Sports Personality of the Year is an annual sports award organised by BBC Northern Ireland.

Winners

See also 
Sport in Ireland
BBC Sports Personality of the Year

References

External links 

Northern Ireland
BBC Northern Ireland
Awards established in 2003
2003 establishments in Northern Ireland